The men's 4 x 100 metres relay at the 1969 European Athletics Championships was held in Athens, Greece, at Georgios Karaiskakis Stadium on 19 and 20 September 1969.

Medalists

Results

Final
20 September

Heats
19 September

Heat 1

Heat 2

Participation
According to an unofficial count, 40 athletes from 10 countries participated in the event.

 (4)
 (4)
 (4)
 (4)
 (4)
 (4)
 (4)
 (4)
 (4)
 (4)

References

4 x 100 metres relay
Relays at the European Athletics Championships